Thomas Jay Webster (born 1971) is an American engineering researcher who was Professor and Art Zafiropoulo Chair in Engineering in the College of Engineering at Northeastern University. He joined the Chemical Engineering Department at Northeastern in 2012 and resigned in 2021, reportedly "after dozens of his studies came under scrutiny online." Webster later (September 21, 2021) stated, "An external investigation panel appointed by Northeastern University consisting of world renowned researchers came to the conclusion in their final report that I had not fabricated or falsified data, and subsequently cleared me of any academic wrongdoing."  His research mainly focuses on the field of nanomedicine. He is the founding editor-in-chief of the International Journal of Nanomedicine and a former president of the Society for Biomaterials. He is a fellow of the American Institute for Medical and Biological Engineering, of Biomaterials Science and Engineering, of the Biomedical Engineering Society, and of the National Academy of Inventors. A January 2022 book chapter he co-authored listed his affiliations as Hebei University of Technology, Tianjin, China and Vellore Institute of Technology, Vellore, India.

References

External links
Former faculty page
Former lab website

Living people
1971 births
Northeastern University faculty
Academic journal editors
Fellows of the American Institute for Medical and Biological Engineering
Fellows of the Biomedical Engineering Society
Fellows of the National Academy of Inventors
University of Pittsburgh alumni
Rensselaer Polytechnic Institute alumni
American nanotechnologists
Biomedical engineers
American chemical engineers
21st-century American engineers